is a Japanese football player.

Playing career
Ito was born in Tokyo on May 2, 1998. He joined J1 League club Sagan Tosu in 2018.

Ito joined J.League club after developing in the youth academies of famous clubs like Bayern Munich, FC Schalke 04, Fortuna Düsseldorf and Grasshopper Club Zürich across his teenage years.

He was noted for being pursued by three countries who he was eligible to represent at under-age level, Australia, Japan and Germany.

In 2018, he joined J.League side Sagan Tosu on a two-year contract. In June 2019, he decided to leave the club in favour of returning to Europe. “This decision was not easy, but I would like to try the overseas challenge one more time. I want to apply what I have learned at Tosu and do my very best from here on,” he said.

He was signed by German club SSV Jeddeloh, where he scored two goals in his first six games, playing a key role as the club avoided relegation from the Regionalliga.

Career statistics

Last update: 27 February 2019

References

1998 births
Living people
Association football people from Tokyo
Japanese footballers
Association football midfielders
Sagan Tosu players
SSV Jeddeloh players
Sportfreunde Lotte players
SV Lippstadt 08 players
Regionalliga players
Japanese expatriate footballers
Expatriate footballers in Germany
Japanese expatriate sportspeople in Germany